Htay Oo is a Burmese politician who is a Amyotha Hluttaw MP for Yangon Region.

Early life and education 

Htay was born in Yangon , Myanmar on June 21, 1956. He graduated from Yangon University of BSc from 1975 to 1979 , Diploma in Economic Law (2000) and Diploma in International Law (2006) at Yangon University.

He also served as Associate Teacher (Htaw Ku, Pioneer Cooperative Farm), Yangon Department of Medical Research and as a lawyer.

Political career
He is a member of the National League for Democracy. In 2015 Myanmar general election and 2020 Myanmar general election, he was elected as a Amyotha Hluttaw MP and elected representative from Yangon Region parliamentary constituency.

Personal life
Htay Oo married Khin Myint. They have one daughter, Khin Arkar.

References

Living people
People from Yangon Region
1956 births